Human rights in Thailand have long been a contentious issue. The country was among the first to sign the UN's Universal Declaration of Human Rights of 1948 and seemed committed to upholding its stipulations; in practice, however, those in power have often abused the human rights of the Thai nation with impunity. From 1977 to 1988, Amnesty International (AI) reported that there were whitewashed cases of more than one thousand alleged arbitrary detentions, fifty forced disappearances, and at least one hundred instances of torture and extrajudicial killings. In the years since then, AI demonstrated that little had changed, and Thailand's overall human rights record remained problematic. A 2019 HRW report expanded on AI's overview as it focuses specifically on the case of Thailand, as the newly government of Prime Minister Prayut Chan-o-cha assumes power in mid-2019, Thailand's human rights record shows no signs of change.

History

In the Ayutthaya period, 14th–18th centuries, the slaves were the lowest rank in the social hierarchy system known as sakdina, and were bound under servitude to a master, who according to the law "had absolute power over their slaves other than the right to take their lives". People could become slaves through various means, including being taken as war captives, through debt, and being born to slave parents. Masters' employment of their slaves varied, as was recorded by Simon de la Loubère, who visited Ayutthaya in 1687. The abolition of slavery in Thailand occurred during the reign of King Chulalongkorn, gradually implemented reforms over several decades, beginning in 1874, with a royal act stipulating that those born into slavery since 1868 be free upon reaching twenty-one years of age. A final Act, dated 1905, which introduced decreasing freedom-price caps and age limits, eventually ended the practice within the next few years. Slavery was explicitly criminalized by the 1908 penal code, section 269, which prohibited the sale and acquisition of slaves. Acts from 1911–13 expanded the coverage of previous laws. Slavery, finally, legally ceased in 1915.

The revolution of 1932 that ended an absolute monarchy increased people rights, influenced by a social democrat, Pridi Banomyong, introduced a democracy and the first constitution of Thailand. It stated in the first article that sovereign power belongs to the people of Siam. The first election began in 1937, with the half of the parliament appointed by nine-year-old King Ananda Mahidol's regent, Aditya Dibabha. Women also had the right to vote and stand for elections.

From 1977 to 1988, Amnesty International reported that there "...were 1,436 alleged cases of arbitrary detention, 58 forced disappearances, 148 torture [sic] and 345 extrajudicial killings in Thailand....The authorities investigated and whitewashed each case."

Many new rights were introduced in the 1997 constitution. These included the right to free education, the rights of traditional communities, and the right to peacefully protest coups and other extra-constitutional means of acquiring power, the rights of children, the elderly, rights of the handicapped, and equality of the genders. Freedom of information, the right to public health and education, and consumer rights were also recognized. A total of 40 rights, compared to only nine rights in the constitution of 1932, were recognized in the 1997 constitution. The 2007 constitution reinstated much of the extensive catalogue of rights explicitly recognized in the People's Constitution of 1997. That constitution outlined the right to freedom of speech, freedom of press, peaceful assembly, association, religion, and movement within the country and abroad.

Legal framework

International treaties
In 1948, Thailand was among the first nations to sign the UN's Universal Declaration of Human Rights. It committed to the International Covenant on Civil and Political Rights international treaty in regard to freedom, political rights and civil liberties since 1997.

Domestic legal protection structure
The current (2016) constitution, drafted by a body appointed by the military junta (NCPO), states in section 4: "The human dignity, rights, liberty and equality of the people shall be protected". This is unchanged from the 2007 constitution. Sections 26 to 63 set out an extensive range of specific rights in such areas as criminal justice, education, non-discrimination, religion, and freedom of expression. Additionally the 2017 constitution introduced the Right to a healthy environment.

Rights and liberties ratings by NGOs
In 2020, Freedom in the World annual survey and report by US-based Freedom House, which attempts to measure the degree of democracy and political freedom in every nation, improved the rating of Thailand from Not Free to Partly Free due to a small decrease in limitations on assembly and strictly controlled elections that, despite significant shortcomings, ended a period of direct military junta. However, it was downgraded again from Partly Free to Not Free due to the dissolution of a popular opposition party, Future Forward Party, that had performed favorably in the 2019 Thai general election, and the military-dominated government’s, led by Prime Minister Prayut Chan-o-cha, crackdown on the 2020–2021 Thai protests calling for democratic reforms. By 2021, the Monarchy and the authoritarian government worsened a civil liberty by using a harsh Lèse-majesté law against activists, untrustful justice system, constrained freedom of expression, and lack of freedom of association. Corruption index was also downgraded from 36 to 35, ranking 110 from 180 countries.

Equality

Racial

Racial discrimination is a prevalent problem in Thailand but is only infrequently publicly discussed. Thailand has made two submissions to the UN International Convention on the Elimination of All Forms of Racial Discrimination, with ongoing issues including government policy towards ethnic groups, especially the Thai Malays, and the country's lack of racial discrimination legislation.

Sex

To mark International Women's Day 2020 on 8 March, Protection International and a network of Thai grassroots organizations handed the government its "Women's Report Card". The government flunked in all major areas of rights protection. The assessment indicates that the government's promise to protect the rights of women is not only perceived as empty, but that the state itself is believed to be the perpetrator of violence against grassroots efforts by Thai women. Thailand is obligated under the Convention on the Elimination of All Forms of Discrimination Against Women (CEDAW) to safeguard women's rights and to follow policy recommendations from the CEDAW committee to right wrongs.
On 30 September 2020, 110 Chief Executives of Thailand-based companies signed Women’s Empowerment Principles by UN, committing to gender equality, equal pay and a safer workplace for women. The document was signed on the 10th anniversary of the Women’s Empowerment Principles (WEP). The event was hosted by "WeEmpowerAsia".

Privacy

In late 2016, the Thai Hacktivist group accused the Thai military of buying decryption technology for monitoring messaging software and social network sites. In 2020, the security forces began using a facial recognition system linked to cellphones in southern Thailand; people who failed to register their phones were shut off from the system. Deputy-Prime Minister Prawit Wongsuwan announced that the 8,200 security cameras operating in the southern Thailand could be fitted with a facial recognition system and could be run with artificial intelligence (AI) in the future. In October 2020, a U.N. report accused the Thai military of spying on people using an AI-enabled CCTV system, collecting biometric information; The Thai military later denied it.

In September 2021, Nattacha Boonchaiinsawat, a Move Forward Party MP, released videos, voice clips, and documents regarding military operations creating fake social media accounts to operate information warfare against the people. The Internal Security Operations Command also involved in deep monitoring of opposition politicians, seen as Prime Minister Prayut Chan-o-cha’s political enemies, and Thai activists.

In late 2021, at least 17 activists in Thailand using Apple devices were warned by Apple that they had been targeted by 'state-sponsored' attackers. They include Panusaya Sithijirawattanakul and Arnon Nampa, who have called for reform of the monarchy, Prajak Kongkirati, an academic at Thammasat University, Puangthong Pawakapan, an academic at Chulalongkorn University, Piyabutr Saengkanokkul, a prominent opposition politician, and Yingcheep Atchanont, of the legal rights non-profit iLaw.

LGBTQ

Both male and female same-sex sexual activity are legal in Thailand, but same-sex couples and households headed by same-sex couples are not eligible. Since 2011, same sex marriage laws have been proposed by LGBTQ groups. In 2021, the Constitutional Court ruled that the definition of marriage as between a man and a woman was constitutional. The verdict stated that members of the LGBTQ community cannot reproduce, as it is against nature, and they are unlike other animals with unusual behaviours or physical characteristics. The ruling was deemed by some as sexist and politically incorrect and enraged the LGBTQ community and rights defenders.

In June 2022, a group of bills that could legalize same-sex unions were passed by the lower house. The most liberal of these bills, proposed by the Move Forward Party, would legalize full same-sex marriage.

Economic & social
In 2021, Prime Minister Prayut Chan-o-cha gave a definition of an equality that the riches use a toll elevated road, and the poor use a road under it, he tried to build both ways so that people can live in dispersion.

Craft brewery and microbrewery are illegal in Thailand, as Thai alcohol law has one of the strictest advertisement control and a large fine, it prevents small businesses to compete with large companies. In June 2022, craft brewery and microbrewery have been unofficially discriminalized because the bill of Move Forward Party MP, Taopiphop Limjittrakorn, passed the lower house.

Freedoms

Freedom of expression

Critics charge that the Thai criminal code's defamation provisions are de facto threats to free speech. Both the civil and commercial codes have provisions to deal with defamation, but plaintiffs often prefer to file criminal cases against activists or the press. Criminal charges, which can result in arrest, seizure of the accused's passport if they are a foreigner, and court proceedings that may last for years, do not require the participation of police or government prosecutors but can be filed directly with a court by the accuser; courts rarely reject these cases. Slander carries a maximum sentence of one year's imprisonment and/or a fine of up to 20,000 baht, while libel is punishable by up to two years in jail and/or a fine of up to 200,000 baht.

Freedom of the press

The Southeast Asian Press Alliance noted that freedom of speech in Thailand's domestic media environment—prior to the 2006 coup considered one of the freest and most vibrant in Asia—had quickly deteriorated following the military ousting of Thaksin Shinawatra. It noted the closure of community radio stations in Thai provinces, the intermittent blocking of cable news channels and the suspension of some Thai websites devoted to discussing the implications of military intervention to Thai democracy. SEAPA also noted that while there seemed to be no crackdown on journalists, and while foreign and local reporters seemed free to roam, interview, and report on the coup as they saw fit, self-censorship was a certain issue in Thai newsrooms.

In 2018, British journalist Suzanne Buchanan reported on a series of tourist deaths and sexual assaults on Ko Tao. Though she has not been to Thailand in years, she is wanted by police who say she is peddling fake news. In 2022 she published a book on the subject called The Curse of the Turtle "The True Story of Thailand's Backpacker Murders" published by Wild Blue Press. In December 2019 a Thai reporter was sentenced to two years in prison for a comment she made about worker's grievances filed against a Thammakaset Company poultry farm. She sent a tweet in 2016 in response to a ruling that the company pay 14 migrant workers 1.7 million baht in compensation and damages for having to work 20 hours a day without a break for 40 consecutive days at a wage less than the legal minimum. In her description of the ruling, she used the term "slave labour" to describe the workers' employment. Thammakaset sued her and the workers for criminal defamation, but lost the case against the workers. The court ruled that her choice of words misrepresented the facts and damaged the firm's reputation. In October 2020, Human Rights Watch wrote a letter demanding the end of harassment of Thai journalist Suchanee Cloitre. The joint letter was also signed by twelve other human rights organizations, calling on the Thailand government to protect journalists and human rights defenders from insignificant criminal proceedings.

In October 2020, Thailand’s Ministry of Digital Economy and Society announced an emergency decree to censor blunt Voice TV on all online media channels. The ministry alleged the station of violating media restrictions under the Emergency Decree on Public Administration in Emergency Situations and the Computer-Related Crime Act, over their coverage on pro-democracy protest in Thailand. In November 2021, the NBTC office led by Lt Gen Peerapong Monakit, an NBTC commissioner, gave a warning to TV operators and concessionaires to reconsider carefully or even refrain from presenting content on some monarchy-related issues from the 2020–2021 Thai protests, in particular the 10-point monarchy reform manifestos. Media outlets viewed the move as a threat, while academics may be reluctant to express opinions on the monarchy for fear of being punished. Analysts said such self-censorship could put all public debate down.

Same Sky Books owner and chief editor, Thanapol Eawsakul was arrested by Technology Crime Suppression Division police on 29 June 2022 for keeping a top secret document. Thanapol had been harassed by Royal Thai Police officers several times since he founded a company which printed critical political books related to the Monarchy of Thailand.

Lèse-majesté

Lèse-majesté law in Thailand is a crime according to Section 112 of the Thai Criminal Code. It is illegal to defame, insult, or threaten the king, queen, heir-apparent, heir-presumptive, or regent. Modern Thai lèse-majesté law has been on the statute books since 1908. Thailand is the only constitutional monarchy to have strengthened its lèse-majesté law since World War II. With penalties ranging from three to fifteen years imprisonment for each count, it has been described as the "world's harshest lèse majesté law" and "possibly the strictest criminal-defamation law anywhere";

Anchan P. was handed 87-year prison sentence for uploading and sharing videos on the internet of an online talk show, after she had been detained in jail for nearly 4 years from 2015, then in 2021, the court convicted her by half to 43 and a half years due to her  guilty plea. The UN Human Rights Committee has declared that "imprisonment is never an appropriate penalty" for lèse majesté case.

On 21 May 2022, the Human Rights Watch reported that a pro-democracy activist, Tantawan “Tawan” Tuatulanon, has been detained and unjustly charged for her peaceful protests. Tawan has advocated reforming the monarchy and abolishing draconian lese majeste. She also started a hunger strike on 20 April 2022, to protest her pre-trial detention. In 2023, Tawan and a fellow prisoner Orawan "Bam" Phupong have been taking part of a hunger strike to protest their inprisonment under the Lese-majeste laws. Both are in weak conditions and have reportedly experienced chest pains and nosebleeds.

Law enforcement abuse on people
In November 2021, Yan Marchal, an 18-years French expatriate in Thailand, was deported to his homeland after he had been mocking the Prayut Chan-o-cha's Thai junta and so on the military dominated government in TikTok. He was stopped by immigration officials in Phuket, after he just arrived from France to Thailand. The reason by the official was Marchal behaviour indicated that he was a possible danger to the public.

On 1 December 2021, the 28-year-old noodle vendor made a headline news, asked Prime Minister Prayut Chan-o-cha to retire quickly to allow others to perform the duties and voiced that Thailand needs a lot of development, while he was welcomed by people in Ban Dung District in Udon Thani. Later Ban Dung police came to her house, asking to see her so that they could keep a record of her, but she declined to meet them, saying she had done nothing wrong. The police denied it later.

Assaults on activists

Between 2018–2019, there had been 11 physical assaults on political activists in Thailand. Police investigations of the assaults have shown no progress.

Regime critic Ekachai Hongkangwarn has been assaulted seven times since 2017. Attacks have targeted his property and his person. The latest assault took place in May 2019, when he was beaten by four attackers in front of a court building. Authorities appear powerless to stop the attacks. One culprit was arrested in 2018, paid a fine, and was released.

On 28 June 2019, anti-junta activist Sirawith "Ja New" Seritiwat was attacked by four assailants wielding baseball bats on a busy Bangkok thoroughfare. Earlier in June, Sirawith was attacked by five men when traveling home from a political event. In the case of the latest attack, the deputy prime minister broke the government's silence on political attacks and ordered the police to act swiftly to find the attackers.

Forced disappearances

According to Amnesty Thailand, at least 59 human-rights defenders have been victims of forced disappearance since 1998. The Bangkok Post counts 80 confirmed disappeared, and likely murdered, since 1980. A report compiled in 2018 by the Thai Lawyers for Human Rights Centre showed that at least 86 political refugees left the country after the 2014 coup d'état for coup-related reasons. The government of Prime Minister Prayut Chan-o-cha continues to refuse to criminalize torture and enforced disappearances.

Human rights advocates across Asia fear that Southeast Asian countries, Thailand, Vietnam, Malaysia, Cambodia, and Laos, have jointly agreed to cooperate to ensnare political activists who have fled their own borders and send them back to their home nations without due process to face torture and possible death. The Bangkok Post has noted that disappearances began to happen after the Thai and Lao governments agreed in December 2017 to cooperate in tracking down persons deemed "security threats".

Among those who disappeared:

 Haji Sulong, a reformist and a separatist who disappeared in 1954. He sought for greater recognition of the Jawi community in Patani.
 Tanong Po-arn, Thai labour union leader who disappeared following the 1991 Thai coup d'état by National Peace Keeping Council against the elected government.
 Somchai Neelapaijit, human rights attorney who championed the rights of Thai-Malay Muslims in the deep south. He was abducted and killed in 2004 during the Thaksin Shinawatra administration. His body was never found and no one has been punished.
 Porlajee "Billy" Rakchongcharoen, Karen-ethnic activist whose murdered remains were later discovered.
 Den Khamlae, villager-turned-activist
 On 22 June 2016, an anti-monarchist in Laos, Itthipol Sukpan, a 28-year-old pro-democracy broadcaster known as DJ Zunho, was snatched by unknown assailants and pulled into the woods. He was never seen again. 
 Wuthipong Kachathamakul, also known as Ko Tee, red shirt activist, disappeared in July 2017.
 Surachai Danwattananusorn, also known as Surachai Sae Dan, a radical red shirt and critic of the monarchy, together with two aides, Chatchan "Phoo Chana" Boonphawal and Kraidet "Kasalong" Luelert. Surachai's family, a year after his disappearance, is still being held liable for 450,000 baht in bail bond fees by the Thai courts system. , the Thai police still consider Surachai a "missing person". They have failed to make progress on the case and the Thai government "...seems to have ignored these cases,..."
 Siam Theerawut, Chucheep Chivasut, and Kritsana Thapthai, three Thai anti-monarchy activists, went missing on 8 May 2019 when they are thought to have been extradited to Thailand from Vietnam after they attempted to enter the country with counterfeit Indonesian passports. The trio are wanted in Thailand for insulting the monarchy and failing to report when summoned by the junta after the May 2014 coup. Their disappearance prompted an "alert statement" from the Thai Alliance for Human Rights. Their disappearance passed the one-year mark on 8 May 2020 with still no sign of the trio.
 Od Sayavongm, a Lao refugee and critic of the Laotian government, disappeared from his Bangkok home on 26 August 2019 and has not been seen since.
 Wanchalearm Satsaksit, an exile who left after the 2014 coup, first for Laos and then Cambodia. He was abducted in Phnom Penh on 4 June 2020 in broad daylight by several men. The Cambodian authorities initially refused to investigate the case, calling it "fake news". The Cambodians relented on 9 June, saying they would investigate while denying any responsibility. The case has galvanized numerous groups into action on Wanchalearm's behalf.

According to the legal assistance group, Thai Lawyers for Human Rights, at least 86 Thais left Thailand seeking asylum abroad following the military takeover in May 2014. Among them are the five members of the Thai band Faiyen. Their music is their crime, as some of their songs mock the monarchy, a serious offense in Thailand. The band, whose name means 'cool fire', announced on social media that its members feared for their lives after "many trusted people told us that the Thai military will come to kill us." In August 2019 Fai Yen band members were admitted to France to seek refugee status. All of those who disappeared in late 2018 and early 2019 were accused by Thai authorities of anti-monarchical activity.

Arbitrary arrest and detention

Since the beginning of 2021, prominent human rights defenders and democracy activists were charged with possibility of more than 100 years each on criminal charges due to involvement in pro-democracy activism. The leading figures of the 2020–2021 Thai protests that called reforms to the monarchy, Arnon Nampa, Panupong Jadnok, Parit Chiwarak, Jatupat (Pai Dao Din), Panusaya (Rung), and Benja Apan were all detained await trial in 2021, in series of detainments and releases, some were imprisoned accumulatively for more than 200 days, after Prime Minister Prayut Chan-o-cha declared to use all laws including Lèse-majesté to the protesters in November 2020.

In 2022, there are series of systematic harassment and detention against young monarchy-reform activists such as Tantawan Tuatulanon case. Tantawan was imprisoned which she protested by hunger strike throughout 37 days. Most activists who mentioned the monarchy were also forced to wear an electronic monitoring (EM) on an ankle by the criminal court. There are more than 15 activists, dissident to the moarchy, still imprison until current day.

Political abuse of psychiatry
On 9 July 2020, Tiwagorn Withiton, Thai political and human rights activist, was forcedly carried out by a group of 6 officers and taken to hospital. In a car, the officers tied his hands with a cloth and inject him with unknown medication. The police searched his house and took his computer and smartphone, and made his mother sign a consent of bringing him to be admitted to Rajanagarindra Psychiatric Hospital in Khon Kaen. Hospital director, Nattakorn Champathong, explained that Tiwagorn had not been forced to enter the hospital. Khon Kaen’s police chief, Major General Puttipong Musikul explained that he was getting treatment because his relatives had him admitted.

Freedom of association

In the wake of the 2006 and 2014 coup d'états, the right to free speech, association, and freedom of movement were seriously eroded. Military governments have implemented bans on political meetings and prohibited media criticism. Political activities of all types were prohibited. The Public Assembly Law enacted in 2015 by the military government requires a protest notice to be filed with authorities 24 hours prior to an event. A violation carries a maximum fine of 10,000 baht. The law has been repeatedly invoked by authorities to suppress gatherings since its enactment.

Elections, political parties, and representation

Regarding 2019 Thai general election, the military junta government failed to make terms for a free and fair national election, according to the Human Rights Watch. The procedure for forming a new government, 250 military-appointed Senates have half the total number of votes for the government as the elected House of Representatives, severely undermines the right of Thai citizens to choose their leaders. Moreover, the electoral process problems consisted of repressive laws restricting freedom of speech, association, and assembly, media censorship, lack of equal access to the media, and lack of independence and impartiality of the national election commission, leading to the dissolution of a major opposition Thai Raksa Chart Party, in which King Vajiralongkorn prohibited Ubol Ratana from entering politics. HRW also stated that the junta disregarded Article 25 of the International Covenant on Civil and Political Rights (ICCPR).

On 20 November 2019, the court convicted Thanathorn Juangroongruangkit, disqualifying his MP status. On 21 February 2020, Future Forward Party was dissolved by the Constitutional Court. Amnasty International stated it violated rights to freedom of expression and association, and HRW condemned that it seriously damaged the return to genuine democratic rule.

Attitude adjustment

Since the 2014 Thai coup d'état, the National Council for Peace and Order had made full use of martial law to prosecute opponents, ban political activity, and censor the media. More than 1,000 people, including academics, political bloggers, activists and politicians, have been detained or sent for "attitude adjustment" at military installations. There are allegations of torture. Prosecutions under the country's strict lèse majesté laws, which protect the monarchy from insult, have risen sharply. The victims said that they were taken out of their house and detained in the military base. Renowned dissents such as Yingluck Shinawatra, Watana Muangsook, Pravit Rojanaphruk, and Karun Hosakul were abused by the NCPO since the coup. Deputy Prime Minister Prawit Wongsuwan told reporters that "If they speak so 100 times, they will be summoned 100 times." Prawit added that "attitude adjustment" can last between three and seven days.

Peaceful protests
On 6 December 2021, the Royal Thai Police arrested more than fifty local villagers from Chana District that came to sit in near the government house, protesting against plans for industrial park in "Southern Economic Corridor".

Freedom of religion

Although Thailand describes itself as a Buddhist State, all religious groups have the freedom to practice and maintain communal institutions in Thailand. The constitution prohibits discrimination based on religious belief and protects religious liberty, as long as the exercise of religious is not harmful to the security of the State. Thai law prohibits alcohol sale on Buddhist holidays, as it violates the 5th of the Five Precepts, the basic Buddhist code of ethics. The Muslim community in the Deep south Thailand continued to express frustration with perceived discriminatory treatment by security forces and what they said was a judicial system that lacked adequate checks and balances.

South Thailand insurgency

Problems have been reported in the southern provinces related to the South Thailand insurgency. Some 180 persons are reported to have died there while in custody in 2004. In a particularly high-profile case, Muslim human rights lawyer Somchai Neelaphaijit was reportedly harassed, threatened, and finally forcibly disappeared in March 2004 following his allegations of torture by state security forces. In 2006, Prime Minister Thaksin Shinawatra stated that he believed that Somchai was dead and that state security forces appeared to be responsible. Five policemen were eventually charged in Somchai's death, though the trial only resulted in one conviction that was overturned on appeal in March 2011. The verdict was denounced by the Asian Human Rights Commission, and Somchai's wife Angkhana declared her intention to continue to appeal the case to the Thai Supreme Court. Since 2007, a number of suspected insurgents in custody have died, some with suspicious injuries.

In late 2019, three young woodcutters were murdered by Thai troops in Bo-ngo Subdistrict, Ra-ngae District, Narathiwat Province. The government claimed initially that the killings occurred in a clash between paramilitary Rangers and terrorists. Later, the Human Rights Protection Committee, appointed by the Fourth Army Area Commander, concluded that soldiers mistook the dead men for terrorists and killed them as they were running away. Families of the deceased pointed out that the young men possessed nothing but wood cutting tools. Images of the dead men on social media showed that each of them was shot in the head—two of them sitting crossed-leg on the ground, leaning forward. The Commander of the Fourth Army Area issued an apology, a compensation payment of 500,000 baht for each death, and transferred the responsible commander of the 45th Ranger Forces Regiment elsewhere.

The Suicide of Khanakorn Pianchana October 2019 called for improvement on the justice in Muslim community in deep south. Judge Khanakorn told the accused, five Muslims, and their family members that he wanted to acquit them due to lack of evidence, but was being forced from above to convict.

From January 2004 to June 2020, Pattani, Yala, and Narathiwat Provinces, together with four districts of Songkhla Province have suffered at least 20,323 violent incidents, resulting in at least 6,997 deaths and 13,143 casualties, 61% of whom were civilians.

Right of asylum

Human rights NGOs consider Thailand "...a place that's no longer safe for refugees." Since the 2014 Thai coup d'état, Thailand has sent 109 Uighurs back to China and a further 52 have been detained for about five years. Gulenists have been refouled to Turkey and others to repressive regimes in the Middle East.

Vietnamese journalist Truong Duy Nhat has been detained in Hanoi (as acknowledged by Vietnamese authorities) after being picked up on 26 January 2019 in Bangkok, right after filing for refuge with the United Nations High Commissioner for Refugees (UNHCR). Thai authorities are now being pressured to investigate Thai police involvement in the abduction and detention of Nhat, according to human rights NGO Amnesty International.

Burmese refugees
Burmese refugees in Thailand can stay in one of the refugee camps along the border with Burma, which protect them from arrest and summary removal to Burma but they lack freedom to move or work. Or, they can live and work outside the camps, but typically without recognized legal status of any kind, leaving them at risk of arrest and deportation. From 2005 to 2011, more than 76,000 Burmese refugees were resettled from the border camps to third countries, though the total number of camp residents has remained at about 140,000.

Camp refugees who venture out of the camps are regarded by the Thai government as illegal aliens and are subject to arrest. Thai police or paramilitaries regularly apprehend camp residents and either return them to camp if the refugees pay sufficient bribes, or send them to one of Thailand's Immigration Detention Centers and then deport them to Burma. Refugees in the camps find themselves subject to abuse and exploitation at the hands of other refugees. Refugees working as camp security as well as camp leaders and camp residents with hidden connections to ethnic armed groups inside Burma all wield power in the camps.

Justice system

Thailand has serious problem in a justice system, reflected on the Suicide of Khanakorn Pianchana, a Thai judge who made a suicide attempt in October 2019 in order to protest against interference in the justice system, and died in a second, fatal suicide attempt in March 2020, after being subject to investigations following his actions. At the time of his first suicide attempt, he was a senior judge in the Yala Provincial Court in south Thailand.

Judicial harassment

Thai government
On February 19, the deputy national police chief, Gen. Sriwara Rangsipramanakul, publicly intimidated Chuchart Kanpai to prosecute him with an insult and making false statements stating Bilal Mohammad (Adem Karadag), his client, was tortured into confessing to the 2015 Bangkok bombing at Erawan Shrine.

In late 2017, Arnon Nampa, human rights activist, criticized the court for punishing his particular group of clients by restricting them from seeing each other. He said that the court had no right to order that. On 5 December, he was charged with violating the Computer Crime Act and contempt of court by Lt.Col.Supharat Kam-in. He denied all charges and believed it was politically motivated against exercising rights to freedom of expression. Human rights NGOs demanded military junta to stop a strategic litigation against public participation (SLAPPs). Front Line Defenders condemned the military junta on judicial harassment of him, strongly believed it linked to his human rights lawyer duty and demanded junta drop all charges against him.

Business sector
The Office of the High Commissioner for Human Rights (UN Human Rights) raised deep concern for judicial system abused by business, Thai poultry producer Thammakaset, to intimidate and silence human rights defenders that exposed the company's exploitative and abusive labour systems. It may create 'chilling effect' on human rights defenders, journalists, and encourage other businesses to do the similar case, particularly against women. The Human Rights Council pressured Thailand to address the abuse of the judicial system and to protect human rights defenders. Angkhana Neelaphaijit is also in the defenders.

On February 2013, the Thai pineapple company 'Natural Fruit' has filed four civil and criminal lawsuits against Andy Hall for computer crimes and defamation, including 300 million Thai baht civil defamation lawsuit. Hall reported to the Finnish NGO Finnwatch for serious labour abuses at the factory in Prachuap Khiri Khan. He also gave an interview to Al-Jazeera on the same report. The report is “Cheap has a high price: Responsibility problems relating to international private label products and food production in Thailand, including allegations of underpaid wages, child labour, distraint of migrant workers' documents, and unsuccessful to provide legally labor leaves.

Torture

The Constitution of Thailand prohibits acts of torture, but the Thai legal system has no definition of torture and torture is not recognized as an offence by Thailand's legal system.

In a report entitled, "Make Him Speak by Tomorrow": Torture and other Ill-Treatment in Thailand that was to have been formally released in Bangkok on 28 September 2016, Amnesty International accused the Thai police and military of 74 incidents of brutality. An Amnesty International press conference to unveil the report was halted by Thai authorities who cited Thai labour laws prohibiting visiting foreigners from working in Thailand. The three foreign speakers were Rafendi Djamin, Amnesty International Director for Southeast Asia and the Pacific, Yubal Ginbar, a lawyer working for the rights group, and Laurent Meillan, acting Southeast Asia representative for the United Nations High Commission on Human Rights. The Thai government denied the torture allegations. The government spokesman, General Sansern Kaewkamnerd, emphasized that, "Our investigations into such allegations have shown no indication of torture, I have seen no indication of torture and the Thai people have seen no indication of torture,..." Jeremy Laurence, a representative of the Office of the United Nations High Commissioner for Human Rights (UNOHCHR) had been scheduled to speak at the press conference. "This incident is another striking illustration of a new pattern of harassment of human rights defenders documenting torture in Thailand," he said.

Thailand has been a signatory to the United Nations Convention against Torture since 2 October 2007. Section 28 of the Thai 2016 constitution states, "A torture, [sic] brutal act or punishment by cruel or inhumane means shall be prohibited."

A bill to prevent torture and enforced disappearance will be put before Thailand's National Legislative Assembly (NLA) in late-December 2018. The bill would criminalise torture and enforced disappearances, including during wars and political unrest. The draft law specifies that the Department of Special Investigation (DSI) be responsible for investigating cases of enforced disappearance and torture. Only in events where DSI officials are accused of such crimes would police be assigned to investigate. Imprisonment for five to 25 years, and/or a fine of 100,000 to 300,000 baht would be levied on guilty parties. Were the bill to become a law, every government agency restricting people's rights would be required to maintain a database of people whose rights are restricted, actions taken, and the disposition of their cases.

On 5 August 2021, the Thai police assaulted Jeerapong Thanapat, a 24-year-old drug suspect, during an interrogation to force him to reveal hidden methamphetamines and to pay a two million baht or US$60,000 bribe for his release. The video appears to show the director of the Muang Nakhon Sawan Province police station, Thitisan Utthanaphon widely known by the nickname "Jo Ferrari", and other police officers suffocating Thanapat with plastic bags until he collapsed and died. The police reportedly ordered doctors at Sawanpracharak Hospital to write in a medical report that the cause of Jeerapong’s death was methamphetamine overdose. In June 2022, Thitisan was convicted of suspect killing and sentenced to a life in prison.

2003 war on drugs

The government's antidrug war in 2003 resulted in more than 2,500 extrajudicial killings of suspected drug traffickers. Prison conditions and some provincial immigration detention facilities are characterized as poor. In 2004 more than 1,600 persons died in prison or police custody, 131 as a result of police actions.

There were summary executions and their innocent victims, such as the 16-month-old girl who was shot dead along with her mother, Raiwan Khwanthongyen, Daranee Tasanawadee, the 8-year-old boy, Jirasak Unthong, who was the only witness to the killing of his parents, Suwit Baison, 23, a cameraman for a local television station, who fell to his knees in tears in front of Thaksin Shinawatra and begged for an investigation into the killing. Both parents were shot dead as they returned home, Suwit said 10 other people in his neighborhood had also been killed after surrendering to the police.

Surayud Chulanont, the junta prime minister vowed to right Mr Thaksin's wrongs. 
Human Rights Watch, says that the panel's original report named the politicians who egged on the gunmen. But after the PPP won the 2007 elections, those names were omitted.

Human trafficking

Human trafficking is a major issue in Thailand.  This includes misleading and kidnapping men from Cambodia by traffickers and selling them into illegal fishing boats that trawl the Gulf of Thailand and the South China Sea. These men are promised better paid jobs but instead forced to work as sea slaves as much as 3 years.  Numerous international news organizations including The Guardian, AP, and The New York Times have extensively covered the topic; The Associated Press, in particular, has won prominent awards for their coverage (although not without controversy for overstating their role in combating trafficking). 
Children trafficking is also another major issue in Thailand forcing kidnapped children as young as four to use as sex slaves in major cities like Bangkok and Phuket. Such activities are especially rife in rural areas of Thailand.

Instances of forced labor in the fish and shrimp industry as well as child labour in the pornography industry are still observed in Thailand and have been reported in the 2013 U.S. Department of Labor's report on the worst forms of child labor and in the 2014 List of Goods Produced by Child Labor or Forced Labor.

Paween Pongsirin, high ranking police officer who investigating human trafficking in Thailand, sought asylum in Australia in 2015. After Paween deeply investigated reaching to many high-profile and high ranking polices and army officers, fear of death threats from the authorities, he fled to Singapore and then entered Australia.

Military conscription

Conscription was introduced in Thailand in 1905, according to the Constitution of the Kingdom, serving in the armed forces is a national duty of all Thai male citizens, but it has disregarded human rights in the military institution, each year reports of abuse, torture, and killing against draftees are common. A violent punishment in the Thai military culture called 'repair' (Thai: ซ่อม), had caused 11 deaths of conscripts during 2009 to 2018. In 2017, Deputy Prime Minister and Defence Minister Prawit Wongsuwon stated a lack of empathy to the victims, pointed that it was common way in Thai military culture.

In a report issued in March 2020, Amnesty International charged that Thai military conscripts face institutionalised abuse systematically hushed up by military authorities. According to Amnesty, the practice has "long been an open secret in Thai society". One of infamous cases was in 2011 which 10 officers torturing Wichian Pueksom to death. Until today there is still no verdict to the officials

Children's rights

Child prostitution

Thailand has an unfortunate reputation for being a centre for child sex tourism and child prostitution. Even though domestic and international authorities work to protect children from sexual abuse, the problem still persists in Thailand and many other Southeast Asian countries.

Child abuse
Child abuse often goes unnoticed in Thailand, except the victim is raped or becomes pregnant. Incest and pedophilia cases in Thailand had been taken lightly, as Thai society deems as famous Thai proverb, 'Their personal family matter, we don't mess.'

In October 2021, a renowned music producer, Jakkawal 'Neung' Saothongyutitum, made many Instagram posts, seen clowning around with his nine-year-old daughter and touching her buttocks, hugging and rubbing her tummy with both his arms under her shirt, rubbing near her crotch area, which Jakkawal later explained that he was scratching at the request of the child. There was public uproar due to the sexual nature of these posts, mentioned over 1.84 million times after a video of one of the incidents was released on TikTok. Jakkawal had not been charged of any crime and denied to go to a counselling after this incident.

Government attitude toward NGOs and activists
In early 2021, Thai government led by Prime Minister Prayut Chan-o-cha had adopted a draft law, Draft Act on the Operations of Not-for-Profit Organizations, to regulate non-governmental organization (NGOs). The bill was mentioned by Amnesty International as an effort to pass repressive legislation to silence civil society groups and NGOs.

In November 2021, Prayut's government started an investigation whether Amnesty International Thailand (AITH) has broken any laws after ultra-royalists called for AITH to be expelled for its support of pro-democracy activists, such as Panusaya (Rung), facing prosecution on royal defamation cases. Under the strict laws against insulting the monarchy, more than 1,600 activists were charged on security laws, including at least 160 people charged with a potential prison term of up to 15 years. Prayut had assigned the Ministry of Interior and the Royal Thai Police to look into the matter, meanwhile the yellow-shirts, pro-government groups rallied in front of the Silom Complex in Bangkok to gather up to one million signatures in support of a campaign to expel AITH from Thailand.

In 1976, Thai police, military personnel and others, were seen shooting at protesters at Thammasat University. Many were killed and many survivors were abused.

See also

Lèse-majesté in Thailand
Censorship in Thailand
Internet censorship in Thailand
Constitution of Thailand
LGBT rights in Thailand

Notes

References

Bibliography

News

Books

External links
Freedom of expression in Thailand - IFEX
Asian Human Rights Commission - Thailand homepage
Rule of Lords Weekly column on human rights & the rule of law in Thailand and Burma
Royal Thai Police catalogue or torture and murder
Thailand 2003. Extrajudicial drug-war killings of innocent people. December 6, 2009. Photo gallery. Press/media links, and human rights reports.

 
Political history of Thailand
Social history of Thailand
Thailand